Kevin Anderson and Rik de Voest were the defending champions, but only de Voest chose to compete this year.
He partnered with Bobby Reynolds, but they lost to Colin Fleming and Ken Skupski in the quarterfinal.
Treat Conrad Huey and Dominic Inglot won the tournament after a win against Ryan Harrison and Jesse Levine 6–4, 7–5 in the final.

Seeds

Draw

Draw

References
 Doubles Draw
 Qualifying Draw

Odlum Brown Vancouver Open
Vancouver Open